The Dodge Durango is a mid-size sport utility vehicle produced by Dodge in three generations starting with the 1998 model year. The first two generations were very similar in that both were based on the Dodge Dakota and Ram Pickup, both featured a body-on-frame construction and both were produced at the Newark Assembly Plant in Newark, Delaware through the 2009 model year.

The third-generation Durango began with the 2011 model year. It is built on the same platform as the Jeep Grand Cherokee, features unibody construction, and has been assembled at the Jefferson North Assembly Plant in Detroit, Michigan, since late 2010.

The Durango is currently the only SUV built by Dodge since the discontinuation of the Dodge Journey as part of Dodge's move to a performance-focused brand.

First generation (DN; 1998)

The Durango was marketed as a sturdy truck-based SUV designed to hold up to seven passengers and tow up to  when properly equipped. The Durango shared a front end, instrument panel, and front seats with the Dakota pickup on which it was based, and its taillights and liftgate handle with Chrysler's minivan models of the time (the Dodge Caravan, Plymouth Voyager and Chrysler Town & Country). Original designs of the eight-passenger Durango featured a rear-facing third-row similar to many older station wagons. To make room for a more practical forward-facing third row, Dodge shortened the length of the front doors and raised the roof two inches (5 cm) beyond the front seats, allowing for stadium seating. The Durango's roof rack was designed to mask the appearance of the raised roof.

The 4.7 L Magnum V8 replaced the 5.2 L Magnum V8 engine for 2000; however, the 5.2 was still available in the early 2000 models. In that same year, a special AWD performance version called the R/T was released with a 5.9 L Magnum V8. In 1999 and 2000, a limited-edition Shelby S.P.360 version was offered that featured a supercharged version of the 5.9 L Magnum V8 engine. Exterior modifications include unique wheels, tires, suspension, and bumpers. It came standard with Viper blue paint with two racing stripes down the center of the truck. It had a  time of 7.1 seconds.

Model year changes

For 1999, the Durango was made available with two-wheel drive. A 3.9 L Magnum V6 engine was available, but few were sold. Minor changes were made for the second year, two new paint colors, and options that included  heated rearview mirrors and steering-wheel-mounted radio controls. Leather seats became standard on SLT Plus models, and body-color wheel flares became standard on SLT Plus and four-wheel drive models.

The 2000 model year included a new 4.7 L Magnum V8 engine, which replaced the reliable 5.2 L Magnum V8, as the standard engine for four-wheel drive models. The 3.9 L Magnum V6 engine was no longer available, leaving only V8s for the rest of the production run. The high-performance Durango R/T came equipped with a performance-tuned 5.9 L Magnum V8 and all-wheel drive.

For 2001, Dodge focused on interior upgrades as Durango's interior trim panels, dash-mounted controls, instrument panel, overhead console, and steering wheel were all redesigned. The transfer case selector on 4X4 models changed from a manual lever on the console to a switch on the dash. The instrument cluster was updated, and an electronic vehicle information center was incorporated into the overhead console. For improved rear passenger comfort, a dual-zone climate-control system was added as standard equipment. Sound systems were improved on all models and now came standard with six speakers. Other minor changes included door panels, revised seats, aluminum wheels, and minor changes to trim options.

In 2002, the new SXT version of the Durango was offered as the entry-level trim package. Optional side curtain airbags were added for safety. The 2003 Durango featured minor mechanical changes, most notable was the addition of four-wheel disc brakes.

In 1999, the 4WD 5.2 L V8 and the 4WD 5.9 L V8 held the best crash test results, earning a 6.8 out of 10 total rating.

Trim levels
1997–2003 - SLT: Most basic trim level of the Durango from 1998 to 2000. Midrange trim level of the Durango from 2001 to 2003. SLT emblem. Included: cloth upholstery, keyless entry, power doors, locks and windows, 15-inch alloy wheels, and an AM/FM stereo with cassette player and four speakers.
1997–2003 - SLT PLUS: Most luxurious trim level of the Durango from 1998 to 2003. Included luxury features. Based on the SLT trim level. Never featured an SLT Plus emblem, but only an SLT emblem. Added: fog lamps, floor mats for the rear seat area, leather upholstery, power driver's seat, security alarm, and an AM/FM stereo with single CD and cassette players with a graphic equalizer, Infinity sound system with 8 speakers, and steering wheel audio controls.
2000–2003 - Sport: More basic trim level of the Durango from 2000 to 2003. Included basic features. Based on the SXT trim level. Sport decals.
2000–2003 - SXT: Most basic trim level of the Durango from 2000 to 2003. Included basic features. SXT decals.
2000–2003 - R/T: "high-performance" trim level of the Durango from 2000 to 2003. Included luxury and performance-oriented features. Based on the SLT Plus trim level. R/T emblems.

The SLT, SLT Plus, and Sport trim levels offered the 3.9 L Magnum V6 engine as standard equipment (late availability starting in 1999), with the 5.2 L and 5.9 L Magnum V8 engines being available options, later switching to the 4.7 L Power-Tech V8 engine, with the 5.9 L Magnum V8 engine optional. The R/T and S.P. 360 trim levels included the 5.9 L Magnum V8 engine as standard equipment.

Engines
1997–2000 —  Magnum V8,  &  of torque
1997–2000 —  Magnum V6,  & 225 lb·ft (305 N·m) of torque
1997–2003 —  Magnum V8,  & 330 lb·ft (449 N·m) of torque
1999–2000 —  Supercharged Magnum V8,  & 412 lb·ft (559 N·m) of torque
2000–2003 —  Magnum V8,  & 345 lb·ft (469 N·m) of torque
2000–2003 —  PowerTech V8,  & 295 lb·ft (400 N·m) of torque

Transmissions
42RE 4-speed TorqueFlite automatic - 3.9 L V6
45RFE 4-speed RFE automatic (2000–2002) - 4.7 L V8
545RFE 5-speed RFE automatic (2003) - 4.7 L V8
44RE 4-speed TorqueFlite automatic - 5.2 L V8
46RE 4-speed TorqueFlite automatic - 5.9 L V8

Second generation (HB; 2004)

The second-generation Durango was first shown as a concept dubbed Dodge Durango R/T concept at the 2003 Detroit Auto Show. It debuted shortly before the companion Dakota. Like the Dakota, it has much in common with the large Dodge Ram pickup, including a fully boxed frame. It is  longer,  wider, and  taller than the previous model. It also offered a third-row bench with three seats, giving it an eight-seat capacity. The design took its styling primarily from the Dodge Powerbox concept, which was itself based on the 1999 Dodge Power Wagon concept, and the 2003-2004 Durango R/T concept. The steering wheel and gauges are shared with the Dakota (2005-2011), and the steering wheel was only shared the Ram Pickup (2004-2008).

Debuting for 2004 was a new coil-spring rear suspension for the solid rear axle. A Watt's linkage system is fitted to the rear axle, centering the axle and reducing rear-end skate over rough surfaces, and allowing a lower and wider cargo floor.

Trim levels

 ST (renamed SE later): 2005-2009: Most basic trim level, basic features. Included: cloth upholstery, 17-inch steel wheels with hubcaps, antilock brakes, keyless entry, tilt steering wheel with speed control, an AM/FM stereo with a single CD player, and air conditioning. SXT added grey running boards and an AM/FM stereo with a 6-disc CD changer with MP3 capability.
 SXT: 2003-2009: Most basic trim level, basic features. 
 SLT: 2003-2009: Value-oriented trim level, value-added features, optional luxury features. Added: premium cloth upholstery, power driver's seat, 7-passenger seating, rear air conditioning, and fog lamps. SLT G package added overhead console with compass, temperature, trip odometer, average fuel economy, and distance to empty, an AM/FM stereo with 6-disc CD changer with MP3 capability, 276-watt Infinity audio system with 8-speakers, 17-inch alloy wheels, Sentry Key, security alarm, garage door opener, and dual sun visors. 
 Adventurer: 2005-2007: Value-oriented and "off-road-look" trim level, value-added features, optional luxury features. Added: V8 engine, 17-inch alloy wheels, rear cargo organizer, and floor mats. 
 Limited: 2003-2009: Most luxurious trim level, luxury features. Added: leather upholstery, power-adjustable pedals, auto-dimming rearview mirror, an AM/FM stereo with 6-disc CD changer with MP3 capability, a 378-watt Infinity sound system with 8 speakers and subwoofer, a memory system for driver's seat, mirrors, stereo, and pedals, automatic headlamps, automatic temp control, power mirrors, and leather-wrapped steering wheel with audio and speed controls.

All trim levels offered the 4.7 L Power-Tech V8 engine as standard equipment, though the 5.7 L Hemi V8 engine was available on all trim levels, except for the base SXT trim level. The base SXT trim level also offered the 3.7 L Power-Tech V6 engine as standard equipment in place of the 5.7 L Hemi V8 engine option, though the V6 engine option was only available on the base SXT trim level, and only between 2004 and 2007.

The 2004 Dodge Durango was the first SUV in DaimlerChrysler's lineup to introduce the 5.7 L Hemi V8 engine, as well as a new radio design and modernized interior features.

Facelift

The 2007 model year featured a facelift that debuted at the Dallas Auto Show in April 2006. It featured a redesigned grille, hood, headlamps, fenders, and wheels. New features included electronic stability control, rear park assist, and a one-touch turn signal.

In 2006, DaimlerChrysler introduced a full-size luxury SUV based on the Durango, called the Chrysler Aspen, for the 2007 model year.

Engines
2009 -  Hemi V8,  at 5200 rpm and 

Hybrid 
For 2009, a hybrid variant of the Dodge Durango and its brother, the Chrysler Aspen, was introduced, This system used the GM-designed two-stage hybrid system and added two 87 hp electric motors to the 5.7L V8 with a total system output of around 385 horsepower. All Durango and Aspen hybrids came standard with 4-wheel drive. The fuel economy for the Durango/Aspen hybrid was improved to 19 miles per gallon in the city, and 20 on the highway, increased from the Hemi's 13 city, 18 highway. But, two months after the car debuted, Chrysler discontinued the hybrid, citing demand had dropped for their full size SUVs due to economic slowdown. They also announced the shutting down of Newark Assembly plant where the hybrid versions were made. Estimated overall production figures for the Durango and Aspen hybrid is around 800 cars.

Chrysler Aspen

The Chrysler Aspen is a luxury SUV from Chrysler. Launched for the 2007 model year, the Aspen was based on the Dodge Durango SUV.

The Aspen was the first truck-based SUV commercialized under the Chrysler brand, although the PT Cruiser was the first truck-based Chrysler brand vehicle as classified under Corporate Average Fuel Economy's (CAFE) regulation. With this introduction, as of 2007, all American automobile brands had an SUV in their range. The truck was unveiled at the 2005 North American International Auto Show. The Aspen came equipped with three rows of seating for eight passengers and available all-wheel drive. It was available in only one trim, Limited.

The 2007 Chrysler Aspen appears in the 2006 film Deck the Halls and the video game The Movies: Stunts and Effects.

Partly due to slow sales, but mostly because the Chrysler-Dodge-Jeep network of dealers merged, Chrysler Aspen was discontinued after the 2009 model year. However, the Dodge Durango Citadel covers the mid-size luxury SUV segment .

Discontinuation
In October 2008, Chrysler announced that the shutdown of the Newark Assembly facility, which produced the Durango and the Chrysler Aspen, would be moved up to the end of 2008, thereby ending production of the Aspen and Durango after the 2009 model year. Production ceased on December 19, 2008.

Third generation (WD; 2011)

Overview 
After announcing the discontinuation of the Durango after the 2009 model year, Dodge released an Internet site and teaser photos of the third-generation Dodge Durango on August 16, 2010.

The 2011 Dodge Durango entered production on December 14, 2010, alongside the second-generation Charger in the 2011 vehicle lineup. It went on sale for general dealership availability in mid-January 2011.

The third-generation Durango is built alongside the Jeep Grand Cherokee at the Jefferson North Assembly Plant in Detroit, Michigan, sharing the assembly line, running gear, powertrains, and chassis parts with the Grand Cherokee. With a slightly longer wheelbase than the Grand Cherokee, the Durango features three rows of seating.

Trim levels

The third generation Durango has been available in several trim levels:

 Express - 2011 only: Base trim level, base features, 3.6 L Pentastar V6 engine only.
 Crew - 2011-2013: Value-added trim level, added features, optional luxury features, 3.6 L Pentastar V6 and 5.7 L Hemi V8 engines.
 SXT - 2012–present: Base trim level, base features, 3.6 L Pentastar V6 engine only.
 SXT Plus - 2014–present: Basic trim level, basic features, 3.6 L Pentastar V6 engine only.
 Crew Plus - 2010-2013: Luxury trim level, luxury features, 3.6 L Pentastar V6 or 5.7 L Hemi V8 engines.
 Limited - 2014–2016: Luxury trim level, luxury features, 3.6 L Pentastar V6 or 5.7 L Hemi V8 engines.
 GT - 2017–present: Sporty trim level that replaces the Limited trim, 3.6 L Pentastar V6 engine only.
 GT Plus - 2019–present: GT trim with selected luxury amenities, 3.6 L Pentastar V6 engine only.
 R/T - 2011–present: Sporty trim level, sporty details, 5.7 L HEMI V8 engine only. First, return to the Dodge Durango lineup since 2001.
 Citadel - 2011–present: Highest trim level, luxurious features, 3.6 L Pentastar V6 or 5.7 L Hemi V8 engines.
 Pursuit - 2019–2023, police model, V6-AWD and V8-AWD. 
 SRT - 2018–present: High performance trim level; 6.4 L Hemi V8 engine only.
 SRT Hellcat - 2021 and 2023: High performance trim level; 6.2 L Hemi V8-S engine only
 Special Service Package was available from 2012 - 2022.

Engines 
The third-generation Durango features four engines. The Pentastar V6 engine is backed by a Mercedes W5A580 five-speed automatic, with Chrysler's controls and the driver-interactive control. Since 2014, Dodge had exclusively used the ZF eight-speed gearbox in two versions in the Durango. All V8's have the ZF 8HP, with all V6s using the Chrysler-built 850re version of the ZF 8HP. The Hemi V8 also comes with a "fuel-saver" (cylinder deactivation) mode. This feature is primarily used when the vehicle is cruising at constant speeds on level ground. In 2021, a supercharged 6.2-liter Hemi V8 was introduced for the SRT Hellcat trim level. However the supercharged 6.2 L Hemi V8 along with the Durango SRT Hellcat trim level was discontinued for the 2022 model year (making the engine a 2021 only powertrain choice) as the engine is unable to be modified further to comply with the tougher stringent automotive emissions requirements.

Updates

Dodge unveiled its revised 2014 model Durango at the 2013 New York International Auto Show. The 2014 Durango was redesigned with sportier-looking lines, an eight-speed automatic transmission, and a new design trim similar to the Rallye, with a blackened plastic bumper and outline. The taillights were reworked to feature a single LED 'Racetrack' tail lamp similar to the Charger and Dart. On the inside, Dodge added a revised steering wheel, instrument cluster, rotary shift knob, and a reconfigurable  thin film transistor display first seen on the Dart.

The 2015 Durango received a new package available for the R/T trim, consisting of a Premium Nappa Leather Group option featuring radar red leather seats, black headlamp bezels, HID low beams and LED DRL'S, optional R/T embroidery on the seats, a nine-speaker sound system with a subwoofer, a  5.7 L Hemi paired with ZF's eight-speed transmission, and a  Granite Crystal wheel finished in black.

For 2016 the Durango received the Pentastar Upgrade V6 which adds Stop/Start, Variable Valve Lift and better engine refinement through a 15% enhanced torque curve and increasing the Variable Valve Timing from 50 degrees to 70 degrees. Other technologies include Cooled EGR and friction reduction. Despite the added tech, the engine weighs  less. The Durango also added new packages to its two trims, with the Anodized Platinum package for the Citadel trim and the Brass Monkey package for the Limited trim.

For 2017, the Dodge Durango Limited trim is discontinued and replaced by the new GT trim and the Base SXT trim level will now be available with three-row seating fitting 7 passengers.

For 2018, all models received the new Uconnect radios and the second-generation ZF 8-speed automatic transmission. The rotary transmission gear shifter has been replaced with a T-grip handle like in the Dodge Charger. The steering wheel has also been changed to a more sporty wheel like found in the Dodge Charger. Other changes include suede insert leather seats and black chrome inserts in the interior on the GT model.

For 2019: The Tow Group IV package gets an integrated trailer brake controller. The Dodge Durango GT trim gets the R/T- and SRT-style grille. A new GT Plus trim is added which adds several amenities to the GT trim, such as heated front and second-row seats and steering wheel; 6-way passenger power seat with 4-way lumbar adjustment; two-position memory for the driver's seat, radio, and mirrors; a power liftgate; and 150W inverter.

For 2021, the Durango receives updated exterior styling, with a revised bumper and headlights, three grille textures, and six new wheel designs. The interior features a new instrument panel with Uconnect 5; an 8.4-inch screen is standard on SXT and GT models, while R/T and Citadel models have a 10.1-inch touchscreen. An SRT Hellcat model with a 710 hp supercharged 6.2 L Hemi V8 was available for 2021 only, after which it was discontinued due to emissions requirements. With the discontinuation of the smaller Journey, the Durango becomes the only SUV in the Dodge vehicle lineup as of 2021.

Safety

NHTSA

IIHS

Recalls 
On August 16, 2012, Chrysler recalled 1,661 2013-model Dodge Durango sport utility vehicles in the United States and Canada because some airbags may not deploy in an accident. The recall affects 1,449 of the seven-passenger versions of the SUVs in the United States and 212 in Canada and other markets.

On July 24, 2015, Chrysler recalled all 2014-2015 Dodge Durangos with the  touch-screens due to security concerns with the software that controls the vehicle because it could be hacked. The vulnerability was discovered by software engineers Charlie Miller and Chris Valasek and initially posted on Wired. This vulnerability would allow hackers to remotely access and take over a variety of features, including those key parts of driving via a vulnerability in the Uconnect infotainment system.

On November 26, 2019, Chrysler issued a recall of 700,000 2011-2013 Durangos and Jeep Grand Cherokees in the United States, Canada, and Mexico, because of an electrical failure that can cause the engine not to start or stop functioning while it is driving. There are no reports of accidents. The FCA group announced a free revision to both models and replacement of these pieces involved in the problem.

Total sales

Dodge Durango sales

Chrysler Aspen sales

Notes

References

External links

Official website

All-wheel-drive vehicles
Durango
Hybrid sport utility vehicles
Mid-size sport utility vehicles
Rear-wheel-drive vehicles
Sport utility vehicles
2000s cars
2010s cars
2020s cars
Cars introduced in 1997